Fritillaria camschatcensis is a species of flowering plant native to northeastern Asia and northwestern North America, including northern Oregon, Washington, British Columbia, Alaska, northern Japan, and the Russian Far East (Amur, Kamchatka, Khabarovsk, Magadan, Primorye, Sakhalin and the Kuril Islands).  It has many common names, including Kamchatka fritillary and Kamchatka lily.

It is also called rice lily, northern rice-root, or (misleadingly) Indian rice or wild rice, because of the rice-like bulblets that form around its roots.

Description
Fritillaria camschatcensis produces bulbs with several large fleshy scales, similar to those of commercially cultivated garlic. Leaves are lanceolate, up to 10 cm long, borne in whorls along the stem. Stem is up to 60 cm tall, with flowers at the top. Flowers are spreading or nodding (hanging downwards), dark brown, sometimes mottled with yellow.

See also
 List of plants known as lily

References

External links
USDA Plants Profile
Photo of the Chocolate Lily
European Garden Flora, Vol. 1

camschatcensis
Flora of Northeast Asia
Flora of Alaska
Flora of British Columbia
Flora of the Northwestern United States
Flora of Oregon
Flora of Russia
Flora of Japan
Hokkaido
Kuril Islands
Plants described in 1809
Root vegetables
Indigenous cuisine in Canada
Flora without expected TNC conservation status